Marco "The Sniper" Piqué (born January 9, 1980) is a Surinamese-Dutch welterweight kickboxer, fighting out of Team Snipers in The Hague, Netherlands. He is the current World Full Contact Association Muay Thai middleweight world champion, WMC intercontinental champion, and a two-time K-1 MAX regional tournament finalist.

Biography and career
Originally from Suriname, Piqué has fought the majority of his fights in the Netherlands.  He won his first title in 2003 when he defeated Alviar Lima via split decision to claim the W.P.K.L. Dutch national Muay Thai title.  Over the next couple of years Piqué claimed the W.F.C.A. Benelux title and the W.P.K.L. European title as well as losing to legendary Thai fighter Jongsanan Fairtex in Las Vegas in a bid to win Fairtex's I.K.K.C. world title belt.  Throughout 2006 Piqué started to regularly face some of the world's best middleweight kickboxers, losing to Buakaw Por. Pramuk, Şahin Yakut and Giorgio Petrosyan, the latter in the final of the annual Janus Fight tournament.  His record was patchy by the end of 2006 but he had a terrific 2007, winning two preliminary tournaments and reaching the final of two more, winning thirteen out of fifteen fights and beating some top fighters such as Chaid Oulad El Hadj and Petr Polak.

In 2008 Piqué made his K-1 MAX debut at the K-1 MAX Netherlands 2008 in Utrecht, making his way to the final in a tough tournament which included a victory over tournament favourite Joerie Mes in the quarter finals.  In the final Piqué found Warren Stevelmans a step too far and was unable to make it to the K-1 MAX final 16 stage.  He entered another K-1 MAX tournament in Sweden later in the year but could only reach the semi finals.  Piqué returned to K-1 MAX the following year, again reaching the final at the K-1 World MAX 2009 Europe but once more failing to make the next step to the K-1 World MAX final by dropping a decision to up and comer Leroy Kaestner.  Piqué made up somewhat for this defeat later in the year by winning the W.M.C. intercontinental title and then the World Full Contact Association (W.F.C.A.) world title in his native Suriname.

He lost to Issam Reghi via decision at Time Fight 2 in Tours, France on October 6, 2012.

On the verge of throwing up, Pique quit on his stool before the fifth round against Raphaël Llodra at Best of Siam 3 in Paris, France, on February 14, 2013.

He lost a unanimous decision to Suriya Prasathinpimai at Thailand vs. Europe 2013 in Neu-Ulm, Germany on March 23, 2013.

On July 6, 2013, Piqué lost to John Wayne Parr by decision at Boonchu Cup: Caged Muay Thai 3 on the Gold Coast, Australia.

He beat Dima Weimer on points at Day of Destruction 7 in Hamburg, Germany on September 14, 2013.

He lost to Grégory Choplin via UD in the main event of Lion Fight 14 in Las Vegas, Nevada, United States on March 28, 2014.

Titles
2010 Superfighters 8 Man Tournament Champion
2009 W.F.C.A. Muay Thai world champion -72.5 kg
2009 W.M.C. Muay Thai Intercontinental title -72.5 kg
2009 K-1 MAX Europe tournament runner up -70 kg
2008 K-1 MAX Netherlands tournament runner up -70 kg
2007 Kings of Kickboxing 2007 Pforzheim preliminary tournament champion -75 kg
2007 Rayong-Dreamfights GP Part II tournament champion -73 kg
2005 W.P.K.L. Dutch Muay Thai champion -76 kg  
2005 W.P.K.L. European Muay Thai champion -76 kg
2004 W.F.C.A. Benelux Muay Thai champion
2003 W.P.K.L. Dutch Muay Thai champion -72.5 kg

Kickboxing

|-
|-  bgcolor="#CCFFCC"
| 2017-05-13|| Win ||align=left| Kadir Tastan||Akin Dovus Arenasi || Turkey || Decision || 3 || 3.00
|-  bgcolor="#FFBBBB"
| 2017-01-14|| Loss ||align=left| Yi Long || 2016 World Kickboxing Championship || Zhengzhou, China || Decision || 3 || 3:00
|-  bgcolor="#FFBBBB"
| 2016-12-03 || Loss ||align=left| Atakan Arslan || Mix Fight Gala 20 || Frankfurt, Germany || Decision (Unanimous) || 3 || 3:00
|-
! style=background:white colspan=9 |
|-
|-  bgcolor="#FFBBBB"
| 2016-05-28|| Loss ||align=left| Masoud Minaei || Akın Dövüs Arenası || Turkey || Decision || 3 || 3.00 
|-
|-  bgcolor="#CCFFCC"
| 2016-04-23|| Win ||align=left| Erkan Varol|| Champions Night || Istanbul, Turkey || Decision || 3 || 3.00 
|-
|-  bgcolor="#FFBBBB"
| 2016-04-03|| Loss ||align=left| Murthel Groenhart || WFL  - Where Heroes Meet Legends, Semi Final|| Almere, The Netherlands || Decision || 3 || 3.00 
|-
|-  bgcolor="#FFBBBB"
| 2016-03-12 || Loss ||align=left| Hysni Beqiri || Superpro Fight Night 7  || Basel, Switzerland || Decision ||3 ||3:00 
|-
|-  bgcolor="#FFBBBB"
| 2015-12-20 || Loss ||align=left| Alessandro Campagna || Invictus Arena, Prestige Fight || Rome, Italy || Decision (unanimous) ||3 ||3:00 
|-
|-  bgcolor="#CCFFCC"
| 2015-12-05|| Win ||align=left| Wang Hesong || WLF || Zhengzhou, China || Decision || 3 || 3.00 
|-
|-  bgcolor="#FFBBBB"
| 2015-10-24 || Loss ||align=left| Marcus Fisher || VVWS  || Panama City, Panama || Decision ||3 ||3:00 
|-
|-  bgcolor="#FFBBBB"
| 2015-03-14 || Loss ||align=left| Harut Grigorian || Enfusion Live 25 || Turnhout, Belgium || Decision || 3 || 3:00 
|-
|-  bgcolor="#CCFFCC"
| 2015-03-07 || Win ||align=left| Sun Weichao || Wu Lin Feng || Zhengzhou, China || Decision (Unanimous) || 3 || 3:00 
|-
|-  bgcolor="#FFBBBB"
| 2015-02-21 || Loss ||align=left| Berat Aliu || Gladiators Fight Night || Baden, Switzerland || Decision || 3 || 3:00 
|-
|-  bgcolor="#CCFFCC"
| 2015-01-16 || Win ||align=left| Michael Corley || Legacy Kickboxing 1 || Houston, USA || TKO (punches) || 3 || 
|-
|-  bgcolor="#CCFFCC"
| 2014-12-05 || Win ||align=left| Jiang Chunpeng || Kunlun Fight 14|| Bangkok, Thailand || Ext.R Decision (Unanimous) || 4 || 3:00 
|-
|-  bgcolor="#CCFFCC"
| 2014-10-04 || Win ||align=left| Erkan Varol || Mix Fight Gala XVI  || Istanbul, Turkey ||Decision (Unanimous) || 3|| 3:00 
|-
|-  bgcolor="#c5d2ea"
| 2014-09-13 || Draw ||align=left| Shkodran Veseli || Gladiators Fight Night || Baden, Switzerland || Decision (Draw) ||  || 3:00
|-
|-  bgcolor="#CCFFCC"
| 2014-05-03 || Win ||align=left| Berat Aliu || La Familia Fightnight 5 || Halle, Germany || Decision (Unanimous) || 3 || 3:00
|-
|-  bgcolor="#CCFFCC"
| 2014-04-26 || Win ||align=left| Steeve Valente || Mix Fight Gala XV || Darmstadt, Germany || TKO (Injury) || 1 ||
|-
|-  bgcolor="#FFBBBB"
| 2014-03-28 || Loss ||align=left| Grégory Choplin || Lion Fight 14 || Las Vegas, Nevada, USA || Decision (Unanimous) || 5 || 3:00
|-
|-  bgcolor="#CCFFCC"
| 2014-03-07 || Win ||align=left|  Mücahit Kulak || AKIN Dövüş Arenası KickBoxing Event || Turkey || Decision   || 3 || 3:00
|-  bgcolor="#CCFFCC"
| 2014-02-22 || Win ||align=left| Shkodran Veseli || Fight Night  || Wien, Austria || Decision (Split) || 5 || 3:00
|-
|-  bgcolor="#FFBBBB"
| 2013-10-12 || Loss ||align=left| Darryl Sichtman || TatNeft Arena World Cup 2013, Final || Kazan, Russia || KO (knee) || 3 || 2:17
|-
|-  bgcolor="#CCFFCC"
| 2013-09-14 || Win ||align=left| Dima Weimer || Day of Destruction 7 || Hamburg, Germany || Decision || 3 || 3:00 
|-
|-  bgcolor="#FFBBBB"
| 2013-07-06 || Loss ||align=left| John Wayne Parr || Boonchu Cup: Caged Muay Thai 3 || Gold Coast, Australia || Decision || 5 || 3:00
|-
|-  bgcolor="#FFBBBB"
| 2013-06-01 || Loss ||align=left| Vladimír Moravčík || Profiliga Muaythai 13  || Banska Bystrica, Slovakia || Decision (unanimous) || 5 || 3:00
|-
! style=background:white colspan=9 |
|-  bgcolor="#FFBBBB"
| 2013-03-23 || Loss ||align=left| Suriya Prasathinphimai || Thailand vs. Europe 2013 || Neu-Ulm, Germany || Decision (Unanimous) || 5 || 3:00
|-
|-  bgcolor="#FFBBBB"
| 2013-02-14 || Loss ||align=left| Raphaël Llodra || Best of Siam 3 || Paris, France || TKO (Retirement) || 4 || 3:00
|-
|-  bgcolor="#FFBBBB"
| 2012-10-06 || Loss ||align=left| Issam Reghi || Time Fight 2 || Tours, France || Decision || 3 || 3:00
|-
|-  bgcolor="#FFBBBB"
| 2012-09-08 || Loss ||align=left| Max Baumert || 5. Merseburger Fight Night || Merseburg, Germany || Decision || 3 || 3:00
|-
|-  bgcolor="#FFBBBB"
| 2012-07-27 || Loss ||align=left| Eakpracha Meenayothin || WMC Prince's Cup 2012, Semi Final || Bangkok, Thailand ||KO  || 1 || 
|-  bgcolor="#CCFFCC"
| 2012-05-26 || Win ||align=left| Jan Mazur || Profiliga Muaythai 12 || Banska Bystrica, Slovakia|| Decision (Unanimous) || 3 || 3:00
|-
|-  bgcolor="#CCFFCC"
| 2012-02-12 || Win ||align=left| Mohammed Medhar || Natural Powers || Eindhoven, Netherlands || Decision || 3 || 3:00 
|-  bgcolor="#FFBBBB"
| 2012-01-21 || Loss ||align=left| Sudsakorn Sor Klinmee || Yokkao Extreme 2012 || Milan, Italy || Decision (Unanimous) || 5 || 3:00
|-  bgcolor="#CCFFCC"
| 2011-09-02 || Win ||align=left| Ali Gunyar || Muay Thai Premier League: Round 3 || The Hague, Netherlands || Decision (Unanimous) || 5 || 3:00
|-  bgcolor="#FFBBBB"
| 2011-09-02 || Loss ||align=left| Nieky Holzken || Muaythai Premier League: Round 1 || Long Beach, California, USA || Decision || 5 || 3:00
|-  bgcolor="#FFBBBB"
| 2011-04-30 || Loss ||align=left| Naruepol Fairtex || Ring Rules Kickboxing || Milan, Italy || Ext.R Decision || 4 || 3:00
|-
|-  bgcolor="#CCFFCC"
| 2011-04-11 || Win ||align=left| Yassin Lahmidi || Almere's Finest || Almere, Netherlands ||Decision (Unanimous) || 5 || 3:00
|-
|-  bgcolor="#CCFFCC"
| 2011-01-22 || Win ||align=left| Bruno Franchi || KnocKOut - Oktagon K-1 || Rome, Italy || Ext.R Decision (Unanimous) || 4 || 3:00
|-
|-  bgcolor="#CCFFCC"
| 2010-12-04 || Win ||align=left| Paolo Bellini || Janus Fight Night 2010 || Padua, Italy || Decision (Unanimous) || 3 || 3:00
|-
|-  bgcolor="#FFBBBB"
| 2010-09-05 || Loss ||align=left| Baker Barakat || Humans Fight Night IV, welterweight tournament semi final || Hamburg, Germany || Med. Int. || 3 || 
|-
|-  bgcolor="#CCFFCC"
| 2010-09-05 || Win ||align=left| Ulli Schick || Humans Fight Night IV, welterweight tournament quarter final || Hamburg, Germany || Decision (Unanimous) || 3 || 3:00
|-
|-  bgcolor="#CCFFCC"
| 2010-07-04 || Win ||align=left| Mourad Ouchen || SLAMM "Last fight before Summer"  || Amsterdam, Netherlands || Decision || 5 || 3:00
|-
|-  bgcolor="#CCFFCC"
| 2010-06-26 || Win ||align=left| Armen Petrosyan || The Shock || Palermo, Italy || Decision || 5 || 3:00
|-
|-  bgcolor="#CCFFCC"
| 2010-04-17 || Win ||align=left| Chris van Venrooij || Superfighters 8 Man Tournament, Final || Frankfurt, Germany || Extension round decision || 4 || 3:00
|-
! style=background:white colspan=9 |
|-
|-  bgcolor="#CCFFCC"
| 2010-04-17 || Win ||align=left| Andreas Rogner || Superfighters 8 Man Tournament, Semi Finals || Frankfurt, Germany || KO || 2 || 
|-
|-  bgcolor="#CCFFCC"
| 2010-04-17 || Win ||align=left| Davit Kiria || Superfighters 8 Man Tournament, Quarter Finals || Frankfurt, Germany || Extension round decision || 4 || 3:00
|-
|-  bgcolor="#CCFFCC"
| 2009-12-23 || Win ||align=left| Bruno Franchi || Klaar Om Te Bosse!! || Paramaribo, Suriname || KO || 3 ||
|-
! style=background:white colspan=9 |
|-
|-  bgcolor="#FFBBBB"
| 2009-11-07 || Loss ||align=left| Yodsanklai Fairtex || Janus FightNight: Thai Boxe Last Challenge || Padua, Italy || Decision (Unanimous) || 3 || 3:00 
|-
|-  bgcolor="#CCFFCC"
| 2009-06-26 || Win ||align=left| Sean Wright || Champions of Champions 2 || Montego Bay, Jamaica || KO (Right Overhand) || 1 || 1:22
|-
! style=background:white colspan=9 |
|-
|-  bgcolor="#CCFFCC"
| 2009-05-31 || Win ||align=left| Tarik Slimani || Next Generation Warriors III || Utrecht, Netherlands || Decision (Unanimous) || 5 || 3:00
|-
|-  bgcolor="#FFBBBB"
| 2009-03-01 || Loss ||align=left| Leroy Kaestner || K-1 World MAX 2009 Europe, Final || Utrecht, Netherlands || Decision (Unanimous) || 3 || 3:00 
|-
! style=background:white colspan=9 |
|-
|-  bgcolor="#CCFFCC"
| 2009-03-01 || Win ||align=left| Hafid El Boustati || K-1 World MAX 2009 Europe, Semi Finals || Utrecht, Netherlands || TKO (Doc Stop/Cut) || 3 ||
|-
|-  bgcolor="#CCFFCC"
| 2009-03-01 || Win ||align=left| Chris Ngimbi || K-1 World MAX 2009 Europe, Quarter Finals || Utrecht, Netherlands || Ext.R Decision (Unanimous) || 4 || 3:00
|-
|-  bgcolor="#FFBBBB"
| 2008-11-30 || Loss ||align=left| Nieky Holzken || SLAMM "Nederland vs Thailand V" || Almere, Netherlands || KO (Left Hook) || 3 || 2:56 
|-
|-  bgcolor="#CCFFCC"
| 2008-10-31 || Win ||align=left| Christian Klingenberg || K-1 Scandinavia Rumble of the Kings 2008 || Luleå, Sweden || KO (Straight Right Punch) || 2 || 0:32
|-
|-  bgcolor="#FFBBBB"
| 2008-06-20 || Loss ||align=left| Diesellek TopkingBoxing || International Muay Thai Fight Night || Montego Bay, Jamaica || Decision || 5 || 3:00 
|-
! style=background:white colspan=9 |
|-
|-  bgcolor="#FFBBBB"
| 2008-05-31 || Loss ||align=left| Dzhabar Askerov || K-1 Scandinavia MAX 2008, Semi Finals || Stockholm, Sweden || Ext.R Decision (Unanimous) || 4 || 3:00 
|-
|-  bgcolor="#CCFFCC"
| 2008-05-31 || Win ||align=left| Bruce Macfie || K-1 Scandinavia MAX 2008, Quarter Finals || Stockholm, Sweden || KO (Right Knee Strike) || 2 || 0:21
|-
|-  bgcolor="#CCFFCC"
| 2008-05-03 || Win ||align=left| Victor Dick || New Generation Warriors || Utrecht, Netherlands || TKO (Doc Stop) || 3 ||
|-
|-  bgcolor="#FFBBBB"
| 2008-02-17  || Loss ||align=left| Warren Stevelmans || K-1 MAX Netherlands 2008, Final || Utrecht, Netherlands || Decision (Unanimous) || 3 || 3:00 
|-
! style=background:white colspan=9 |
|-
|-  bgcolor="#CCFFCC"
| 2008-02-17 || Win ||align=left| Imro Main || K-1 MAX Netherlands 2008, Semi Finals || Utrecht, Netherlands || Decision (Unanimous) || 3 || 3:00
|-
|-  bgcolor="#CCFFCC"
| 2008-02-17  || Win ||align=left| Joerie Mes || K-1 MAX Netherlands 2008, Quarter Finals || Utrecht, Netherlands || Ext.R Decision (Unanimous) || 4 || 3:00
|-
|-  bgcolor="#FFBBBB"
| 2007-11-24  || Loss ||align=left| Giorgio Petrosyan || Janus Fight Night 2007, Final || Padova, Italy || Decision (Unanimous) || 3 || 3:00 
|-
! style=background:white colspan=9 |
|-
|-  bgcolor="#CCFFCC"
| 2007-11-24 || Win ||align=left| Yassine Benhadj || Janus Fight Night 2007, Semi Finals || Padova, Italy || Decision || 3 || 3:00
|-
|-  bgcolor="#CCFFCC"
| 2007-11-24  || Win ||align=left| Mark Vogel || Janus Fight Night 2007, Quarter Finals || Padova, Italy || Ext.R Decision || 4 || 3:00
|-
|-  bgcolor="#CCFFCC"
| 2007-10-28 || Win ||align=left| Takashi Ono || Shootboxing Battle Summit Ground Zero 2007 || Tokyo, Japan || Decision || 3 || 3:00
|-
|-  bgcolor="#FFBBBB"
| 2007-09-30  || Loss ||align=left| Dennis Schneidmiller || RDF Dodge Trophy Final 2007, Final || Ulm, Germany || Decision (Split) || 3 || 3:00 
|-
! style=background:white colspan=9 |
|-
|-  bgcolor="#CCFFCC"
| 2007-09-30 || Win ||align=left| Foad Sadeghi || RDF Dodge Trophy Final 2007, Semi Finals || Ulm, Germany || Decision || 3 || 3:00
|-
|-  bgcolor="#CCFFCC"
| 2007-09-30 || Win ||align=left| Dennis Oliwka || RDF Dodge Trophy Final 2007, Quarter Finals || Ulm, Germany || Decision || 3 || 3:00
|-
|-  bgcolor="#CCFFCC"
| 2007-08-26 || Win ||align=left| Yavuz Ozden || Return of the King I || Paramaribo, Suriname || KO || 2 || 
|-
|-  bgcolor="#CCFFCC"
| 2007-06-02 || Win ||align=left| Chaid Oulad El Hadj || Gentleman Fight Night IV || Tilburg, Netherlands || Decision || 5 || 3:00
|-
|-  bgcolor="#CCFFCC"
| 2007-05-04 || Win ||align=left| Ali Gunyar || Steko's Fight Night 24, Final || Pforzheim, Germany || Decision (Unanimous) || 3 || 3:00
|-
! style=background:white colspan=9 |
|-
|-  bgcolor="#CCFFCC"
| 2007-04-05 || Win ||align=left| Luis Reis || Steko's Fight Night 24, Semi Finals || Pforzheim, Germany || Decision (Unanimous) || 3 || 3:00
|-
|-  bgcolor="#CCFFCC"
| 2007-04-21 || Win ||align=left| Ricardo Hernandez || C.L.K Mucho Machismo || Lisbon, Portugal || KO || 2 ||
|-
|-  bgcolor="#CCFFCC"
| 2007-04-07 || Win ||align=left| Abraham Roqueni || Balans Fight Night || Tilburg, Netherlands || TKO (Corner Stoppage) || 1 || 
|-
|-  bgcolor="#CCFFCC"
| 2007-01-27 || Win ||align=left| Petr Polak || Rayong-Dreamfights GP Part II, Final || Giengen, Germany || Decision || 3 || 3:00
|-
! style=background:white colspan=9 |
|-
|-  bgcolor="#CCFFCC"
| 2007-01-27 || Win ||align=left| Pacco Koscielniak || Rayong-Dreamfights GP Part II, Semi Finals || Giengen, Germany || TKO || 1 || 
|-
|-  bgcolor="#FFBBBB"
| 2006-12-02  || Loss ||align=left| Giorgio Petrosyan || Janus Fight Night 2006, Final || Padova, Italy || Decision (Unanimous) || 3 || 3:00 
|-
! style=background:white colspan=9 |
|-
|-  bgcolor="#CCFFCC"
| 2006-12-02 || Win ||align=left| Samkor Kiatmontep || Janus Fight Night 2006, Semi Finals || Padova, Italy || Decision || 3 || 3:00
|-
|-  bgcolor="#CCFFCC"
| 2006-12-02  || Win ||align=left| José Reis || Janus Fight Night 2006, Quarter Finals || Padova, Italy || Decision || 3 || 3:00
|-
|-  bgcolor="#FFBBBB"
| 2006-11-12 || Loss ||align=left| Alviar Lima || 2H2H Pride & Honor Ahoy 2006 || Rotterdam, Netherlands || Decision (Unanimous) || 5 || 3:00 
|-
|-  bgcolor="#FFBBBB"
| 2006-06-03  || Loss ||align=left| Şahin Yakut || Gentleman Fight Night III  || Tilburg, Netherlands || KO || 4 ||
|-
|-  bgcolor="#FFBBBB"
| 2006-03-19 || Loss ||align=left| Buakaw Por. Pramuk || SLAMM "Nederland vs Thailand" || Almere, Netherlands || Decision (Unanimous) || 5 || 3:00 
|-
|-  bgcolor="#CCFFCC"
| 2005-12-21 || Win ||align=left| Franklin Beuk || The Night of Immortality || Paramaribo, Suriname || TKO || 3 ||
|-
|-  bgcolor="#FFBBBB"
| 2005-10-30 || Loss ||align=left| Najim Ettouhali || It's Showtime 75MAX Trophy Alkmaar, Pool A Semi Finals || Alkmaar, Netherlands || Decision || 3 || 3:00 
|-
|-  bgcolor="#CCFFCC"
| 2005-09-04 || Win ||align=left| Nadir Lahrech || Muay Thai Champions League XIV || Amsterdam, Netherlands || Decision || 5 || 3:00
|-
! style=background:white colspan=9 |
|-
|-  bgcolor="#FFBBBB"
| 2005-05-28 || Loss ||align=left| Malaipet Sasiprapa || Muay Thai World Championships || Las Vegas, Nevada, USA || Decision || 5 || 3:00 
|-
! style=background:white colspan=9 |
|-
|-  bgcolor="#CCFFCC"
| 2005-04-30 || Win ||align=left| Roy Jones || Beatmasters Show|| Manchester, England, UK || TKO || 5 || 
|-
! style=background:white colspan=9 |
|-
|-  bgcolor="#FFBBBB"
| 2005-02-05 || Loss ||align=left| Jongsanan Fairtex || Muay Thai World Championships || Las Vegas, Nevada, USA || TKO (Ref Stop/Punch) || 3 || 1:15 
|-
! style=background:white colspan=9 |
|-
|-  bgcolor="#CCFFCC"
| 2004-11-14 || Win ||align=left| Alain Dumas || MT/MF Fight Gala || Almere, Netherlands || Decision || 5 || 3:00
|-
|-  bgcolor="#CCFFCC"
| 2004-09-25 || Win ||align=left| Rasit Biner || Gala Schuttersveld || Rotterdam, Netherlands || KO (Knee Strike) || || 
|-
! style=background:white colspan=9 |
|-
|-  bgcolor="#FFBBBB"
| 2004-04-21 || Loss ||align=left| Youness El Mhassani || Profighters Gala in Almere || Almere, Netherlands || Decision || 5 || 3:00
|-
|-  bgcolor="#FFBBBB"
| 2004-02-22 || Loss ||align=left| Alviar Lima || 2H2H || Rotterdam, Netherlands || Decision (Unanimous) || 5 || 3:00
|-
|-  bgcolor="#FFBBBB"
| 2003-11-30 || Loss ||align=left| Ali Gunyar || Killerdome V || Amsterdam, Netherlands || Decision || 5 || 3:00
|-
|-  bgcolor="#CCFFCC"
| 2003-10-19 || Win ||align=left| Ron Post || Zaantheater || Zaandam, Netherlands || Decision (Unanimous) || 5 || 3:00
|-
|-  bgcolor="#CCFFCC"
| 2003-05-31 || Win ||align=left| Alviar Lima || Muay Thai Express I || Rotterdam, Netherlands || Decision (Split) || 5 || 3:00
|-
! style=background:white colspan=9 |
|-
|-  bgcolor="#FFBBBB"
| 2003-04-12 || Loss ||align=left| Nadir Larech || Magic Duo Part 3 || Eindhoven, Netherlands || Decision || 5 || 3:00
|-
|-  bgcolor="#FFBBBB"
| 2003-03-29 || Loss ||align=left| Şahin Yakut || Muaythai Champions League Rome, Pool B Final || Rome, Italy || TKO (Corner Stoppage) || 2 || 
|-
! style=background:white colspan=9 |
|-
|-  bgcolor="#CCFFCC"
| 2003-03-29 || Win ||align=left| Maurizio Romita || Muaythai Champions League Rome, Pool B Semi Finals || Rome, Italy || Ext.R Decision || 4 || 3:00 
|-
|-  bgcolor="#FFBBBB"
| 2003-02-15 || Loss ||align=left| William Diender || Xena Sport Victory or Hell 8 || Amsterdam, Netherlands || Decision || 5 || 3:00 
|-
|-  bgcolor="#FFBBBB"
| 2002-07-07 || Loss ||align=left| Gago Drago || Bad Boys Day Part 1 || Netherlands || KO (Right High Kick) || 4 || |-
|-  bgcolor="#FFBBBB"
| 2002-04-21 || Loss ||align=left| Gago Drago || Xena Sport Victory or Hell 7 || Netherlands || Decision (Unanimous) || 5 || 3:00 
|-
|-  bgcolor="#c5d2ea"
| 2002-02-17 || Draw ||align=left| Benito Caupain || W.P.K.L. Gala in Hogendorphal|| Amsterdam, Netherlands || Decision Draw || 5 || 3:00 
|-
|-  bgcolor="#FFBBBB"
| 2001-11-03 || Loss ||align=left| Faldir Chahbari || Gala in Brediushal || Amsterdam, Netherlands || Decision || 5 || 2:00 
|-
|-
| colspan=9 | Legend:

See also
List of K-1 Events
List of K-1 champions
List of male kickboxers

References

1980 births
Living people
Dutch male kickboxers
Surinamese male kickboxers
Welterweight kickboxers
Middleweight kickboxers
Dutch Muay Thai practitioners
Surinamese Muay Thai practitioners
Surinamese emigrants to the Netherlands
Sportspeople from Paramaribo
Sportspeople from Almere
Kunlun Fight kickboxers